Maria Sarabaş (born January 2, 1948) is a folk music singer from Chişinău, Moldova. She was a notable member of the Christian-Democratic People's Party (Moldova), serving as the Honorary president of "Societatea Doamnelor Creştin-Democrate" (from 26 November 2000 to June 2005, when Sarabaş left the party).

Discography
 Dragul meu, Badeal meu cu ochi birnaci (S 30 18649-5); 
 Bate vintul prin cвmpie, lonel cвnd s-a sculat, Blestemul, Satul meu, grădină dulce, Colind, La căsuţa dintre tei (S 30 29307).

Awards 
 Titlul de artistă a poporului, 2010 
 Maestru al artei din Republica Moldova (1994); 
 Laureată a Festivalului mondial al tineretului şi studenţilor (Moscova, 1985).

Bibliography
 „Sunt pusă on fata alter, nativei — să cant sau so renunţ la căntec", on: „Literatura şi arta", 13. XI. 1986, Chişinău; 
 Moroşanu, D., Maria Sarabaş, on: „Femeia Moldovei", nr. 9, 1987, Chişinău; 
 „Visez să-mi mai bată la geampasărea-norocul", on: „Moldova", nr. 9, 1988, Chişinău; 
 Caciuc, A., Setea Maria Sarabaş, on: „Viaţa satului", 7. XL 1990, Chişinău; 
 Morăraş, M. „Mă făcui, maică, frumoasă", on: „Viaţa satului", 4. III. 1994, Chişinău; 
 Iuncu, R., 30 de ani de căntec ai Mariei Sarabaş, on: „Flux", 21. VII. 1995, Chişinău. 
 Serafim Buzilă, Interpreţi DIN MOLDOVA Lexicon enciclopedic (1460-1960)Chişinău 1996.

References

External links 
 Maria Sarabas Biografie 
 Timpul de dimineață, Maria Sarabaş: „Lucrez fără bani” 
 Jurnal de Chişinău, File secrete din biografia lui Iurie Muntean(u)
 

1948 births
Living people
People from Cahul District
20th-century Moldovan women singers
Moldova State University alumni
People's Artists of Moldova